Tommi Jalmari Rinne (21 January 1925 – 10 June 1999) was a Finnish actor.  He appeared in 76 films and television shows between 1946 and 1998. He starred in the film Kaks' tavallista Lahtista, which was entered into the 10th Berlin International Film Festival.

Selected filmography
 Tweet, Tweet (1958)
 Sven Tuuva the Hero (1958)
 Kaks' tavallista Lahtista (1960)

References

External links

1925 births
1999 deaths
Actors from Oulu
Finnish male film actors
20th-century Finnish male actors